Arthur C. Martinez is a businessman, former CEO of Sears, who is best known as the person who led a turnaround of Sears, Roebuck, and Company in the 1990s. Prior to joining Sears, Martinez worked for several companies, including RCA Records. He entered the retail business in 1980 when he became the chief financial officer for Saks Fifth Avenue. In 1992 Martinez became the head of the Sears Merchandise Group and three years later he became the chief executive officer of Sears, Roebuck, and Company. During his eight-year tenure at Sears, Martinez initiated a major overhaul of the company's operations and made the company profitable again. He is best known for changing the company's marketing strategy to focus on women as well as men. Martinez retired in 2000, although he continues to serve on the boards of directors for several businesses. He graduated from New York University Tandon School of Engineering with an undergraduate degree and also received an MBA from Harvard University.  In 1995, Arthur Martinez was honored with an Edison Achievement Award for his commitment to innovation throughout his career.

References

Polytechnic Institute of New York University alumni
Harvard Business School alumni
Living people
1939 births
American retail chief executives
Sears Holdings people
People from New York City